The 2022 Sun Belt Conference Football Championship Game was a college football game played on December 3, 2022, at Veterans Memorial Stadium in Troy, Alabama. It was the fourth edition of the Sun Belt Conference Football Championship Game and determined the champion of the Sun Belt Conference for the 2022 season. The game began at 2:40 p.m. CST on ESPN. The game featured the Coastal Carolina Chanticleers, the East Division champions, and the Troy Trojans, the West Division champions. Sponsored by tire company Hercules Tires, the game was officially known as the 2022 Hercules Tires Sun Belt Football Championship.

Teams

Coastal Carolina Chanticleers

Coastal Carolina clinched a spot in the championship game following their defeat of Southern Miss on November 12.

Troy Trojans

Troy clinched a spot in the championship game following their defeat of Arkansas State on November 26. The win also ensured they would host the game. Troy is looking for its first Sun Belt title since 2017 and first outright title since 2009.

Game Summary

References

Sun Belt Conference Football Championship Game
2022 Sun Belt Conference football season
Troy Trojans football games
Coastal Carolina Chanticleers football games
Sun Belt Championship Game
2022 in sports in Alabama